Hadi Rani ki Baori is a stepwell located in Todaraisingh town in Tonk district of Rajasthan state in India. It is believed that it was built in 17th century AD. 

The stepwell is rectangular in plan with double-storeyed corridors on one side each having arched doorway and below the lower storey there are images of Brahma, Ganesa and Mahishasuramardini.

References

Stepwells in Rajasthan
Tourist attractions in Tonk district